Wanderley Machado da Silva (3 June 1938 – 5 March 2020), known simply as Wanderley, was a Brazilian footballer who played as a forward.

Club career
Born in Niterói, Rio de Janeiro, Wanderley began his career at CR Vasco da Gama. Profiting from his brother's signature with Valencia CF he also moved to Europe, but after being shown the door by the latter club, joined neighbouring Elche CF.

In 1962 Wanderley signed for Levante UD also in the Valencian Community, being only registered on 1 January 1963. He enjoyed a prolific first season, scoring 12 goals in only 16 matches and being promoted to La Liga.

Wanderley made his debut in the Spanish top division on 15 September 1963, in a 4–4 away draw against RCD Español. He scored his first goal in the competition on the 28th, but in a 5–3 loss at Valencia.

Wanderley was an ever-present figure for the Granotes in the following campaigns, scoring a hat-trick in a 4–2 home victory over Atlético Ceuta on 15 January 1967. He left the club in that year's summer, and subsequently represented CD Málaga and Hércules CF, retiring with the latter in 1972.

International career
Wanderley appeared with the Brazilian under-23s at the 1960 Summer Olympics, appearing in all of the matches and scoring in a 4–3 win against Great Britain. The nation was eliminated in the group stage by hosts Italy.

Personal life and death
Wanderley's older brother, Waldo, was also a footballer and a forward. He spent most of his career with Fluminense FC and Valencia, and the pair were teammates at Hércules.

Wanderley settled in the Valencian municipality of Massanassa after retiring. On 5 March 2020, he died due to Alzheimer's disease at the age of 81.

References

External links

1938 births
2020 deaths
Sportspeople from Niterói
Afro-Brazilian sportspeople
Brazilian footballers
Association football forwards
CR Vasco da Gama players
La Liga players
Segunda División players
Elche CF players
Levante UD footballers
CD Málaga footballers
Hércules CF players
Olympic footballers of Brazil
Footballers at the 1960 Summer Olympics
Brazilian expatriate footballers
Expatriate footballers in Spain
Brazilian expatriate sportspeople in Spain
Deaths from dementia in Spain
Deaths from Alzheimer's disease